Sigsworth is a surname. Notable people with the surname include:

 Guy Sigsworth, British composer, producer and songwriter
 Jessica Sigsworth (born 1994), an English footballer
 Phil Sigsworth (born 1959), Australian rugby league footballer
 Richard Sigsworth (born 1974), British, Park home and holiday lodge specialist 
 Ron Sigsworth (born 1961), Australian rugby league footballer